Hindsiclava jungi is a species of sea snails, a marine gastropod mollusc in the family Pseudomelatomidae, the turrids.

Description
The length of the shell attains 59 mm.

Distribution
This marine species occurs off Isla Margarita, Venezuela

References

 Macsotay, Oliver, and Régulo Campos Villaroel. Moluscos representativos de la plataforma de Margarita, Venezuela: descripción de 24 especies nuevas. Editora Rivolta, 2001.
 B. Landau and C. Marques da Silva. 2010. Early Pliocene gastropods of Cubagua, Venezuela: Taxonomy, palaeobiogeography and ecostratigraphy. Palaeontos 19:1-221

External links
 

jungi
Gastropods described in 2001